National Legal Services Authority of India (NALSA) was formed on 9 November 1995 under the authority of the Legal Services Authorities Act 1987. Its purpose is to provide free legal services to eligible candidates (defined in Sec. 12 of the Act), and to organize Lok Adalats for speedy resolution of cases. The Chief Justice of India is patron-in-chief of NALSA while the second senior-most Judge of the Supreme Court of India is the Executive-Chairman. There is a provision for similar mechanism at state and district level also headed by Chief Justice of High Courts and Chief Judges of District courts respectively. The prime objective of NALSA is speedy disposal of cases and reducing the burden of judiciary.

The current Executive-Chairman of NALSA is Justice Sanjay Kishan Kaul.

See also 
 Legal awareness

References

Legal aid
1995 establishments in India
Law of India